The 34th AVN Awards, presented by Adult Video News (AVN), honored the best pornographic movies and adult entertainment products of between October 1, 2015, and September 30, 2016, and took place on January 21, 2017, at The Joint in Hard Rock Hotel and Casino, Paradise, Nevada. During the ceremony, Adult Video News presented AVN Awards (often referred to as the Oscars of porn ) in 117 categories. Webcam star Aspen Rae and reigning AVN Female Performer of the Year Riley Reid co-hosted the ceremony, each for the first time. Master of ceremonies was comedian Colin Kane.

Suicide Squad XXX: An Axel Braun Parody won the most awards with nine, including Best Movie and Best Parody along with Best Actress for Kleio Valentien.

Winners and nominees 
The nominees for the 34th AVN Awards were announced on November 17, 2016, at the annual AVN Awards Nominations Party at Avalon nightclub in Hollywood.

The winners were announced during the awards ceremony on January 21, 2017.

The major performer awards went to Adriana Chechik, AVN Female Performer of the Year Award; Mick Blue, Male Performer of the Year and Hollie Hendrix, Best New Starlet. In terms of movies, the big winners were Suicide Squad XXX: An Axel Braun Parody, The Submission of Emma Marx: Exposed, The Preacher's Daughter and Natural Beauties, each with three or more awards.

Major awards 
 

Winners of categories announced during the awards ceremony January 21, 2017, are highlighted in boldface, and indicated with a double dagger.

Additional award winners 
The following is the list of remaining award categories, which were presented apart from the actual awards ceremony.

CONTENT CATEGORIES
 BBW Performer of the Year: Angel DeLuca
 Best All-Girl Group Sex Scene: Serena Blair, Celeste Star & Alix Lynx, AI: Artificial Intelligence
 Best All-Girl Movie: Missing: A Lesbian Crime Story
 Best All-Girl Series: Women Seeking Women
 Best Amateur/Pro-Am Movie: Amateur POV Auditions 26
 Best Amateur/Pro-Am Series: Amateur Introductions
 Best Anal Movie: The Art of Anal Sex 3
 Best Anal Series: Anal Beauty
 Best Anthology Movie: Natural Beauties
 Best Art Direction: Suicide Squad XXX: An Axel Braun Parody
 Best BDSM Movie: Deception: A XXX Thriller
 Best Big Butt Movie: Anikka vs. Kelsi
 Best Big Bust Movie: Big Wet Breasts 3
 Best Cinematography: Eddie Powell, The Submission of Emma Marx: Exposed
 Best Comedy: Cindy Queen of Hell
 Best Continuing Series: Angela Loves ...
 Best Director - Feature: Jacky St. James, The Submission of Emma Marx: Exposed
 Best Director – Foreign Feature: John Stagliano, Hard in Love
 Best Director – Foreign Non-Feature: Nacho Vidal, Nacho Loves Nekane
 Best Director – Non-Feature: Greg Lansky, Natural Beauties
 Best Director – Parody: Axel Braun, Suicide Squad XXX: An Axel Braun Parody
 Best Double Penetration Sex Scene: Abella Danger, Mick Blue, Markus Dupree, Abella 
 Best Editing: Eddie Powell, The Submission of Emma Marx: Exposed
 Best Ethnic/Interracial Series: Black & White
 Best Ethnic Movie: Asian Fuck Machines
 Best Foreign Feature: Sherlock: A XXX Parody
 Best Foreign Non-Feature: Rocco's Italian Porn Boot Camp 2
 Best Foreign Series: Rocco One on One
 Best Gonzo Movie: Angela Loves Gonzo
 Best Group Sex Scene: Jojo Kiss, Katrina Jade, Casey Calvert, Goldie Rush, Keisha Grey, Prince Yahshua, Lexington Steele, Rico Strong; Orgy Masters 8
 Best Ingénue Movie: Fresh Girls 3
 Best Interracial Movie: My First Interracial 7
 Best Makeup: Cammy Ellis, May Kup, Suicide Squad XXX: An Axel Braun Parody
 Best Marketing Campaign – Company Image: Blacked/Tushy/Vixen
 Best Marketing Campaign – Individual Project: No on Prop 60, Julia Ann
 Best MILF Movie: Dirty Rotten Mother Fuckers 10
 Best New Imprint: Vixen
 Best New Series: Her 1st Interracial
 Best Non-Sex Performance: Nyomi Banxxx, Suicide Squad XXX: An Axel Braun Parody
 Best Older Woman/Younger Girl Movie: Mother-Daughter Exchange Club 44
 Best Oral Movie: Facialized 3
 Best Orgy/Gangbang Movie: Gangbanged 7
 Best Polyamory Movie: Babysitting the Baumgartners
 Best Screenplay: Jacky St. James, The Submission of Emma Marx: Exposed
 Best Screenplay – Parody: Axel Braun, Suicide Squad XXX: An Axel Braun Parody
 Best Sex Scene in a Foreign-Shot Production: Misha Cross, Nikita Bellucci, Hard in Love
 Best Solo/Tease Performance: Asa Akira, Asa Goes to Hell
 Best Soundtrack: The Submission of Emma Marx: Exposed
 Best Special Effects: Supergirl XXX: An Axel Braun Parody
 Best Specialty Movie – Other Genre: Marshmallow Girls 4
 Best Specialty Series – Other Genre: Schoolgirl Bound
 Best Supporting Actor: Brad Armstrong, The Preacher's Daughter
 Best Taboo Relations Movie: Tabu Tales: Me, My Brother and Another

Content (ctd.)

 Best Three-Way Sex Scene – Boy/Boy/Girl: Kleio Valentien, Tommy Pistol, Charles Dera, Suicide Squad XXX: An Axel Braun Parody
 Best Three-Way Sex Scene – Girl/Girl/Boy: Alex Grey, Karla Kush, Christian Clay, Anal Beauty 4
 Best Transsexual Movie: Real Fucking Girls
 Best Transsexual Series: Trans-Visions
 Best Transsexual Sex Scene: Buck Angel, Valentina Nappi, Girl/Boy 2
 Best Virtual Reality Sex Scene: Joanna Angel, Abella Danger, Manuel Ferrara, Angel 'n Danger
 Clever Title of the Year: Aunts in My Pants
 Female Foreign Performer of the Year: Misha Cross
 Mainstream Star of the Year: Julia Ann
 Male Foreign Performer of the Year: Danny D.
 MILF Performer of the Year: Kendra Lust
 Most Outrageous Sex Scene: Holly Hendrix’s Anal Experience, Jonni Darkko/Evil Angel; Holly Hendrix, Adriana Chechik & Markus Dupree in “Creamy Bottom Fun Ball Happy Time”

WEB & TECHNOLOGY
 Best Affiliate Program: Famedollars.com
 Best Alternative Website: Kink.com
 Best Dating Website: Flirt.com
 Best Membership Website: Tushy.com
 Best Porn Star Website: TashaReign.com
 Best Solo Girl Website: Bryci.com
 Best Virtual Reality Innovation/Site: HoloGirlsVR.com
 Best Web Director: Glenn King

PLEASURE PRODUCTS
 Best Condom Manufacturer: Trojan
 Best Enhancement Manufacturer: MD Science Labs
 Best Fetish Manufacturer: Stockroom
 Best Lingerie or Apparel Manufacturer: Fantasy Lingerie
 Best Lubricant Manufacturer: System JO
 Best Pleasure Product Manufacturer – Large: NS Novelties
 Best Pleasure Product Manufacturer – Medium: Jopen
 Best Pleasure Product Manufacturer – Small: Berman Innovations/POP Dildo

RETAIL & DISTRIBUTION
 Best Boutique: Cupid's Closet (Westchester, CA)
 Best Retail Chain – Large: Lion's Den
 Best Retail Chain – Medium: Ambiance, The Store for Lovers
 Best Retail Chain – Small: Babeland
 Best Web Retail Store: AdultEmpire.com

FAN AWARDS
 Favorite Cam Guy: AdamSinner
 Favorite Camming Couple: CookinBaconNaked
 Favorite Male Porn Star: Johnny Sins
 Favorite Trans Cam Star: Aubrey Kate
 Favorite Trans Porn Star: Aubrey Kate
 Hottest MILF: Kendra Lust
 Hottest Newcomer: Lana Rhoades
 Most Amazing Sex Toy: Angela White Fleshlight
 Most Epic Ass: Alexis Texas
 Most Spectacular Boobs: August Ames
 Social Media Star: Riley Reid
 Web Queen: Kissa Sins

Multiple nominations and awards 

Suicide Squad XXX: An Axel Braun Parody won the most awards with nine, followed by The Submission of Emma Marx: Exposed with five. Other multiple award-winning movies were Natural Beauties and The Preacher's Daughter win three apiece and Abella, Cindy Queen of Hell, Hard in Love and Missing: A Lesbian Crime Story with two each. As well, Anal Beauty 4 and Angela Loves Gonzo both won an individual award in addition to being part of best series awards.

AVN Honorary Awards

Hall of Fame 

AVN on December 28, 2016, announced the 2017 inductees into its hall of fame, with the Pleasure Products Branch honorees announced the following day:
 Video Branch: Monique Alexander, Mick Blue, Stuart Canterbury, Cassidey, Rinse Dream, Kelly Holland, Steve Holmes, Sara Jay, Tory Lane, Mandingo, Daisy Marie, Aurora Snow, Charmane Star, Mark Stone, Christian XXX.
 Executive Branch: Joe Dambrosio, Danny Gorman, Jeff Steward, Gabor Szabo (aka Gabor Esterhazy).
 Internet Founders Branch: Gyorgy Gattyan, Michael Reul, Jim McBride.
 Pleasure Products Branch: Chuck Harnish, Jim Horne, Big Al Bedrosian, Dell Williams.

Presenters and performers 
AVN announced the 2017 AVN Awards Trophy Girls would be Uma Jolie and Gina Valentina.

Ceremony information 
AVN added two new categories to the 2017 awards show, to recognize the emerging virtual reality genre: Best Virtual Reality Sex Scene and Best Virtual Reality Innovation, the latter honoring "the most significant technological advance in the production or presentation of VR entertainment."

References

External links 

 

AVN Awards
2016 film awards
AVN Awards 34